Thomas O'Brien (born 7 August 1991) is a Scottish footballer who plays for Scottish Championship side Arbroath as a central defender.

Career
O'Brien began his footballing career at Dunfermline Athletic's Academy, but moved to Cowdenbeath in 2003. He signed professional terms in 2007, and after loan spells with Rosyth and Kelty Hearts, he made his first team debut on 7 August 2010, in a 2–0 home loss against Ross County. O'Brien scored his first professional goal on 1 October 2011, in a 1–1 away draw against Arbroath.

At the end of the 2014–15 season, O'Brien signed a two-year contract with Scottish League One side Forfar Athletic. He spent two seasons with Forfar, and was named in the 2016–17 PFA Scotland League Two Team of the Year after helping his club return to League One.

O'Brien subsequently signed a two-year deal with Angus rivals Arbroath on 1 June 2017.

Career statistics

Honours

Club
Cowdenbeath
 Scottish Second Division: 2011–12

Arbroath
 Scottish League One: 2018–19

Individual
 Scottish League Two Player of the Month: September 2016
 PFA Scotland Scottish League Two Team of the Year: 2016–17
 PFA Scotland Scottish League One Team of the Year: 2017–18, 2018–19

References

External links
 

1991 births
Living people
Footballers from Dunfermline
Scottish footballers
Association football defenders
Cowdenbeath F.C. players
Forfar Athletic F.C. players
Arbroath F.C. players
Scottish Football League players
Scottish Professional Football League players
Kelty Hearts F.C. players